Lieutenant General Gilbert Lebeko Ramano  (born 7 July 1939) is a South African military commander.

Career 
Ramano was born in Sophiatown. He completed his schooling at Madibane High School and worked as a senior clerk at the WNLA mines depot in Johannesburg from 1961 to 62.

He left South Africa in 1962 to join the armed wing of the African National Congress, Umkhonto weSizwe (MK). He attended a number of military courses in Tanzania, Egypt (special operations) and the Soviet Union, including a Soviet Army Staff Course in 1971. He returned to South Africa in 1992 and attended the Zimbabwe Army Staff Course in 1994.

In 1995, he attended the SANDF Joint Staff Course and was appointed General Officer Commanding Northern Cape Command in July of that year.

In May 1997 he was appointed Deputy Chief of the Army and on 1 July 1998 he was promoted to lieutenant-general and appointed Chief of the Army.

Honours and awards
In 1999, Lt General Ramano was awarded the Order of the Star of South Africa
His awards include the following:
 
 
 
 
 
 
 
 
 
 
 
 
 
  Order of Military Merit (Brazil)

See also
List of South African military chiefs

References

|-

UMkhonto we Sizwe personnel
Living people
1939 births
Chiefs of the South African Army